Anjirlu Rural District is in the Central District of Bileh Savar County, Ardabil province, Iran. At the census of 2006, its population was 4,368 in 852 households; there were 4,049 inhabitants in 981 households at the following census of 2011; and in the most recent census of 2016, the population of the rural district was 2,951 in 932 households. The largest of its 26 villages was Qiz Qalehsi, with 761 people.

References 

Bileh Savar County

Rural Districts of Ardabil Province

Populated places in Ardabil Province

Populated places in Bileh Savar County